1067 Fifth Avenue is a luxury cooperative located on Fifth Avenue between East 87th and 88th Streets in the Upper East Side of Manhattan in New York City.

History
The , 12-story building was designed in the Châteauesque style by C. P. H. Gilbert and completed in 1917, becoming only the second luxury residential building to be erected on Fifth Avenue (after McKim, Mead & White's 998 Fifth Avenue, which was completed in 1912). It was built by the 1067 Fifth Avenue Company, who obtained a $500,000 mortgage from Hanover Mortgage Company in 1915. The building is the Upper East Side's only example of the Châteauesque style applied to a high-rise. At the time of its construction, it was flanked by private homes, including one that belonged to Henry Phipps Jr., who had "declined to buy the empty land to the north".

It retains its original façade, characterized by French Gothic details around the windows and on the roofline and elaborate carved stone ornamentation including dragons and dolphins. The building has 12 floors with 13 apartments, each overlooking Central Park.

In 1940, the Bowery Savings Bank foreclosed on the property and acquired the building at a foreclosure auction, bidding $180,000. At the time, the 1067 Fifth Avenue Company, Inc. owed the bank $283,502 for the mortgage, as well as $15,000 in taxes and other liens. In 1947, the owner obtained reductions in assessed valuations amounting to $205,000 for 1944–45, 1945–46, and 1946–47 following an order from Judge Benjamin F. Schreiber. In 1955, the entire building was sold by William F. Chatlos to an investor.

Notable residents
 Edith Claire Cram
 Charles P. Franchot
 Elie Hirschfeld
 Daniel David Brockman and Elizabeth Brockman
 Miles N. Ruthberg and Catherine Schreiber Ruthberg

References

External links

1067 Fifth Avenue, Tenth Floor Apartment at the Columbia University Library

1917 establishments in New York City
C. P. H. Gilbert buildings
Châteauesque architecture in the United States
Condominiums and housing cooperatives in Manhattan
Fifth Avenue
Gothic Revival architecture in New York (state)
Residential buildings completed in 1917
Upper East Side